Kružberk is a municipality and village in Opava District in the Moravian-Silesian Region of the Czech Republic. It has about 200 inhabitants.

Geography
The municipality is located on the left bank of the Moravice River, which forms the municipal border. A small part of the nearby Kružberk Reservoir, which was named after the municipality, is located in its territory.

History
The first written mention of Kružberk is from 1377 as Creuczenburg.

After the World War II, the German inhabitants of Kružberk were expelled and the municipality was resettled by Czechs.

Sights
The landmarks of Kružberk are the Church of Saints Peter and Paul from the 15th century, and the Church of Saint Florian.

References

External links

Villages in Opava District